The Contract with America was signed by the following list of 367 Republican candidates for U.S. Congress on the steps of the U.S. Capitol on September 27, 1994. All candidates had won the Republican nomination in their respective districts and were candidates in the 1994 U.S. Congressional general elections.


List of 1994 Contract with America Signers
Three days after the signing of the Contract with America, Democratic Congresswoman from Georgia, Cynthia McKinney stated in the Congressional Record that the list of signers had not been made public.

The list of Contract With America signers was released to the public by the organizers of the Contract with America including Newt Gingrich, Dick Armey, Ed Gillespie and Bob Schellhas, the Republican National Committee, and the National Republican Congressional Committee. It was published between October and December 1994 with three different publishers (Three Rivers Press, Time Books, and Random House) in paperback editions all using the same title, Contract With America; The Bold Plan by Rep. Newt Gingrich, Rep. Dick Armey and the House Republicans to Change the Nation and same .<ref>{{cite book|title=Contract with America; The Bold Plan by Rep. Newt Gingrich, Rep. Dick Armey and the House Republicans to Change the Nation|year=1994|publisher=Random House|location=New York|isbn=0-8129-2586-6|author=Gillespie, Ed|author2=Bob Schellhas|url=https://archive.org/details/contractwithamer00ging}}</ref>

Alabama

Arizona

Arkansas

California

Colorado

Connecticut

Delaware
Michael Castle (DE at Large)

Florida

Georgia

Hawaii

Idaho

Illinois

Indiana

Iowa

Kansas

Kentucky

Louisiana

Maine

Maryland

Massachusetts

Michigan

Minnesota

Mississippi

Missouri

Nebraska

Nevada

New Hampshire

New Jersey

New Mexico

New York

North Carolina

North Dakota

Ohio

Oklahoma

Oregon

Pennsylvania

Rhode Island

American Samoa
Amata Coleman Radewagen (Samoa, at large)

South Carolina

South Dakota
Jan Berkhout (SD, at large)

Tennessee

Texas

Utah

Virginia

Washington

West Virginia

Wisconsin

Wyoming
Barbara Cubin (WY, at large)

See also
 Contract With America
 Republican Revolution
 United States House of Representatives elections, 1994
 104 U.S. Congress

References

 Republican Contract With America. Washington, D.C.: Republican National Committee and Three Rivers Press, 1994.
 Gingrich, Newt and Richard K Armey, Ed Gillespie, and Bob Schellhas. Contract With America; The Bold Plan by Rep. Newt Gingrich, Rep. Dick Armey and the House Republicans to Change the Nation. New York: Times Books, 1994.
 Gillespie, Ed and Bob Schellhas. Contract with America; The Bold Plan by Rep. Newt Gingrich, Rep. Dick Armey and the House Republicans to Change the Nation. New York: Random House, 1994.
 Klinkner, Philip A. Midterm: The Elections of 1994 in Context''. Westview Press, 1996.

Contract with America signers
Contract with America signers
Contract with America singers, 1994

Conservatism in the United States
Political history of the United States
Republican Party (United States) politicians